Ustilentyloma is a genus of fungi found in the family Microbotryaceae. It contains 4 species.

References

External links

Basidiomycota genera
Microbotryales